The International Alliance of Research Universities (IARU) was launched on 14 January 2006 as a co-operative network of 10 leading, international research-intensive universities who share similar visions for higher education, in particular the education of future leaders. The IARU Chair is elected from among the IARU Presidents for a period of 2 years. Past IARU Chairpersons: At the launch the presidents elected Professor Ian Chubb, 2005 - 2008 (Australian National University); Professor Tan Chorh Chuan, 2009 - 2012 (National University of Singapore); Professor Ralph Eichler, 2013 - 2014 (ETH Zurich); Professor Ralf Hemmingsen, 2015 - 2016 (University of Copenhagen); Professor Nicholas Dirks, 2017 (University of California, Berkeley); Chancellor Carol Christ, 2017 - 2018 (University of California, Berkeley); President Makoto Gonokami, 2018 - 2020 (University of Tokyo). The present Chair of IARU is the Vice-Chancellor of the University of Cambridge, Professor Stephen Toope. 

In January 2016, the University of Cape Town joined as the 11th member.

Its Presidents meet annually at a host university venue to discuss joint initiatives under the following categories:
Global education initiatives, which includes the flagship Global Summer Program ;
Institutional joint networking;
Grand Challenge, and most notably its Campus Sustainability; and,
Research initiatives.

List of institutions
 Australian National University
 ETH Zurich
 National University of Singapore
 Peking University
 University of California, Berkeley
 University of Cambridge
 University of Cape Town
 University of Copenhagen
 University of Oxford
 University of Tokyo
 Yale University

External links
IARU website

International college and university associations and consortia